Merlin's Furlong is a 1953 mystery detective novel by the British writer Gladys Mitchell. It is the twenty sixth entry in her long-running series featuring the psychoanalyst and amateur detective Mrs Bradley.

Synopsis
Three seemingly unconnected deaths in and near the rural setting of Merlin's Furlong prove to be linked by a cult practicing black magic.

References

Bibliography
 Klein, Kathleen Gregory. Great Women Mystery Writers: Classic to Contemporary. Greenwood Press, 1994.
 Magill, Frank Northen . Critical Survey of Mystery and Detective Fiction: Authors, Volume 3. Salem Press, 1988.
 Reilly, John M. Twentieth Century Crime & Mystery Writers. Springer, 2015.

1953 British novels
Novels by Gladys Mitchell
British crime novels
Novels set in England
British detective novels
Michael Joseph books